Barlow at Large, later Barlow, is a British police procedural television programme broadcast in the 1970s, starring Stratford Johns in the title role.

Johns had previously played Barlow in the Z-Cars, Softly, Softly and Softly, Softly: Taskforce series on BBC television during the 1960s and early 1970s. Barlow at Large began as a three-part self-contained spin-off from Softly, Softly: Taskforce in 1971 with Barlow co-opted by the Home Office to investigate police corruption in Wales. Johns left Softly, Softly for good in 1972, but returned for a further series of Barlow at Large in the following year, Barlow having gone on full-time secondment to the Home Office. This second series, rather than telling one story in serial form, as the 1971 series had, was instead ten 50-minute episodes, each with a self-contained story (this would be the format of all subsequent series). In this series, Barlow was supported by Norman Comer as Detective Sergeant Rees, who had been helpful to him during the first series. He also had to deal with the political machinations of the senior civil servant Fenton (Neil Stacy).

In 1974 the series was retitled Barlow and a further two series of eight episodes each followed, introducing the character of Detective Inspector Tucker, played by Derek Newark. The final episode was transmitted in February 1975. The Barlow character was seen again in the series Second Verdict in which he, along with his former colleague John Watt (Frank Windsor), looked into unsolved cases and unsafe convictions from history.

Episodes were 50 minutes in length and were filmed in colour:

 Series 1: 15 September - 29 September 1971, 3 episodes
 Series 2: 7 February - 11 April 1973, 10 episodes
 Series 3: 23 January - 13 March 1974, 8 episodes
 Series 4: 8 January - 26 February 1975, 8 episodes

Cast
Stratford Johns - (DCS Charlie Barlow /... 1971, 1973-1975 / Series 1-4 / 29 episodes)
Norman Comer - (DS David Rees /... 1971, 1973-1974 / Series 1-3 / 13 episodes)
Neil Stacy - (A. G.(Anthony Gordon) Fenton /... 1973-1975 / Series 2-4 / 18 episodes)
Derek Newark - (DI Eddie Tucker /... 1974-1975 / Series 3-4 / 15 episodes)

Others:
Tenniel Evans - (Chief Con. James 1971 / Series 1 / 2 episodes)
Philip Madoc - (Rizzi 1973-1975 / Series 2-4 / 3 episodes)
Noel Willman - (Sir Hugh Anderson 1973-1974 / Series 2-3 / 2 episodes)
Ray McAnally - (Commander Benson 1973-1974 / Series 2-3 / 2 episodes)

External links
 

1970s British police procedural television series
1971 British television series debuts
1975 British television series endings
English-language television shows
British television spin-offs